Glušca is a village in the municipalities of Foča, Republika Srpska and Foča-Ustikolina, Bosnia and Herzegovina.

Demographics 
According to the 2013 census, its population was nil, down from 34 living in the Republika Srpska part in 1991, and none living in the Foča-Ustikolina part then.

References

Populated places in Foča
Populated places in Foča-Ustikolina